Francesco Munzi (born 1 September 1969 in Rome) is an Italian film director and writer.  His first film Saimir won as Best debut film at Nastri d'argento , at the Venice International Film Festival and was nominated at the European Film Award and at the David di Donatello. He is best known for the 2014 film Black Souls, which won several awards at the Venice Film Festival and the Best Film, Best Director and Best Script awards at the 60th David di Donatello Awards.

References

External links

1969 births
Italian film directors
Italian screenwriters
Italian male screenwriters
Film people from Rome
David di Donatello winners
Living people